Nichaya Thamboolam is a 1962 Indian Tamil-language romantic drama film, directed and produced by B. S. Ranga. The film stars Sivaji Ganesan and Jamuna. It was released on 9 February 1962. The film was released in Telugu as Pelli Thambulam.

Plot 

A senior police officer, Ranganathan, has a spoilt son, Raghuraman. Ranganathan's wife (Raghu's mother) Kamakshi is a kind-hearted lady. Raghu falls in love with Seetha, is the daughter of a poor teacher, Ramanna. Ranganathan's family and Ramanna's family are related to each other. When Seetha born, both parents agreed that she should be married to Raghu and exchanged the Nichaya Thamboolam. However, due to their status, the families had been estranged from each other. Raghu marries Seetha and begets a child. But Raghu suspects Seetha's fidelity and walks out. To complicate matters further, Raghu is charged with the murder of his friend Pattusamy. Seetha takes the blame on herself in order to save Raghu. After more twists and turns it is revealed that Pattusamy is alive. The families come together and all live happily.

Cast 

Male cast
Sivaji Ganesan as Raghu / Raghuraman
M. N. Nambiar as Pattusamy
S. V. Ranga Rao as Ranganathan
V. Nagayya as Ramanna
T. S. Durairaj as Pichai Muthu
 S. Rama Rao

Female cast
Jamuna as Seetha
P. Kannamba as Kamakshi
Rajasree as Sarala
Malathi as Parvathi
Jothi (special appearance in "Nee Nadanthaal Enna")

Production 
For the song "Padaithane Padaithane", Ranga initially built an elaborate set; however he had it torn down and "instead painted the floor wet black and used lamp posts".

Soundtrack 
The music composed by Viswanathan–Ramamoorthy and the lyrics were penned by Kannadasan. "Padaithane Padaithane" is set in Bilaskhani Todi, a Hindustani raga.

Reception 
The film was a box-office success, though it did not hit the 100-day mark.

References

External links 
 

1962 romantic drama films
1960s Tamil-language films
1962 films
Films directed by B. S. Ranga
Films scored by Viswanathan–Ramamoorthy
Indian romantic drama films